Libya or Libyan may refer to:

 Libya, a country in north Africa
 Ancient Libya, a general term often used to refer to Africa in ancient times
 Italian Libya, the name of Libyan state under Italian rule
 Kingdom of Libya, the name of a Libyan state which existed between 1951 and 1969
 History of Libya under Muammar Gaddafi, the history of the state of Libya under the extended dictatorship of Muammar Gaddafi, from 1969 until his ousting, in 2011
 Libyan Arabic, a specific dialect of the Arabic language
 Libya (mythology), the name given to a daughter of Egyptian King Epaphus in mythology
 Libya Montes, a highland terrain on planet Mars
 MV Libya, a Greek coaster originating as Empire Spinney

See also
 Lybia, a genus of crabs
 List of minor biblical tribes#Lehabim, a Biblical figure